Big Brother 2002, also known as Big Brother 3, was the third series of the British reality television series Big Brother. The show followed fourteen contestants, known as housemates, who were isolated from the outside world for an extended period of time in a custom built House. Each week, one or more of the housemates were evicted by a public vote. The last remaining housemate, Kate Lawler, was declared the winner, winning a cash prize of £70,000.

As with the previous two series, Big Brother 3 lasted 64 days. It launched on Channel 4 on 24 May 2002 and ended on 26 July 2002. Davina McCall returned as presenter for her third consecutive year. Twelve housemates entered on launch night, with two additional housemates being introduced in later weeks.

The series was watched by an average of 5.8 million viewers, making it the highest viewed series of the show to date. Its finale peaked at 10 million viewers - making it both the 2nd most watched episode of Big Brother UK and the tenth most watched broadcast by Channel 4 to date.

Production

Auditions
The potential housemates applied via home video, successful candidates were invited to further auditions.

Presenters
Davina McCall returned as host of the weekly eviction show, launch night and finale night. Marcus Bentley narrated the highlight shows, McCall narrated the highlights shown on Friday night, which she did not continue the following year. Dermot O'Leary returned as host of spin-off show Big Brother's Little Brother on E4.

Sponsorship
The series was the first to be sponsored by the newly named O2, the mobile network had sponsored the previous series however with their old name BT Cellnet.

Broadcasts
The series premiered on 24 May 2002, on Channel 4. The contestants were recorded 24 hours a day with cameras fixed around the house, and had to wear portable microphones. Big Brother 3 was the first of the main series to feature a live launch. Previously, Celebrity Big Brother 1 had featured a live launch. The launch night saw Davina give a house tour, as well as discuss rumors that had been going on about the series. She then introduced the new Housemates, and they entered the house live. Channel 4 broadcast a daily highlights show, and from the first week there was a live eviction show hosted by Davina McCall, where the evicted housemate was interviewed. In the nightly highlight episodes, viewers are shown various highlights of a specific day in the house. Big Brother 3 saw the return of the psychiatrists providing commentary on events in the game, with the episodes featuring them being the highlights show after the most recent eviction. The live eviction episode was held on Friday, with a pre-eviction episode and an official eviction episode being held with a 60-minute gap between them. Live coverage was a major part of E4's schedule for the second year running. The season ended on 26 July 2002, lasting for a total of 64 days. Big Brother 3 saw numerous spin-off series' occur while it was on air. The Saturday Night Live spin-off began this season, and saw Housemates competing in live tasks. It would last until midway through Big Brother 5, when it was axed due to poor ratings. Though not introduced this season, the Big Brother's Little Brother spin-off continued throughout this season, giving the show its second season. Following this season, the special What the Housemates Did Next aired, and would later air after every season until Big Brother 9.

Eye logo
The eye logo for the series was an orange eye with circular shapes evolving from the pupil, with a green background.

Format
This series saw a number of changes and a number of firsts which would continue in future series: it was the first and only series to issue a 'three strikes and you're out' form of disciplinary, all succeeding series have simply issued formal warnings to a housemate who breaks the rules. Big Brother 3 also started the eviction process not being limited to housemate nominations, in Week 1, the public made the nominations and the housemates made the final decision on who would go, in Week 7, two housemates faced eviction simply for being given video messages from home, future series also began experimenting with the eviction process. The first eviction took place a week earlier than the previous two series', rather than wait two weeks to evict a housemate, the first eviction took place just one week after the housemates entered, evictions in the first week have since become common in subsequent seasons. It was the first non-celebrity series to feature a Live Launch Show - although the previous celebrity series featured one. Previously, 10 housemates would enter the house on Day 1, usually with one other housemate arriving later on in the series, Big Brother 3, saw the arrival of 12 housemates on launch night, two housemates left the house voluntarily - this was the first time this happened, but quitting has become more common over the years - both were replaced by standby contestants, making it the first time to feature more than one non-original housemate, again late entry housemates have become more common in subsequent series. Big Brother 3 saw the house divided into 'Rich/Poor' for four weeks, a live task broadcast on Saturday nights would determine which side the housemates would end up living for the week. The Rich/Poor divide was not used again until the ninth series in 2008, where it was renamed Heaven/Hell.

House
Big Brother 3 was the first series to be filmed at Elstree Studios, where it was still operating in 2017; interviews with the housemates took place inside the George Lucas Stage and remained here until Ultimate Big Brother in 2010.

Prizes
The fourteen Housemates in the game are competing for the grand prize of £70,000. Each week, the Housemates attempted to complete various tasks assigned by Big Brother in exchange for a weekly budget, which they used to buy food and luxuries; this included buying things such as alcohol and cigarettes. Big Brother 3, much like the previous seasons, did not feature luxury competitions or prizes throughout the season. Big Brother 3 did offer prizes to the Housemates such as phone calls and video messages from home.

House
Big Brother 3 saw the series move to a different location, as Newham London Borough Council ordered the complex to be returned to a natural habitat after planning permissions expired in 2002 for the former house. The Big Brother house has been located at Elstree Studios, Borehamwood, Hertfordshire, since Big Brother 3 onward. The house this season featured a completely different layout and look when compared to the two previous seasons. The house featured vibrant colors such as reds and oranges for both the walls and the furniture. This house was the first to feature stairs going from the front door to the house. On the launch night, host Davina McCall stated that there were numerous arguments over the sofa in the house, and that the one selected was the third to be placed in the house. The kitchen remained simple, with only necessities such as an oven, fridge, and sink. In the "Diary Room", in which housemates may speak privately and reveal their true feelings to the public, there is a more interesting look to it. The background of the room has the features the Big Brother logo of an eye in the background, with the chair this season is big and bright red. Like the previous editions, there are two bedrooms this season, with Davina referring to one of them as the "uncomfortable bedroom." Like the last season, the men and women chose to sleep in separate bedrooms, though this was not required by the rules. Big Brother 3 saw the return of chickens in the backyard, which was also a feature used in the first two seasons. The chickens are used as a source to get eggs, thus Housemates are not required to buy eggs as part of their shopping list. The house also features a garden, which the housemates use to grow plants and vegetables to eat. This season had a pool in the backyard, making it the first season in which one was provided. Before the season began, there were rumors that a twist this season would see two houses being former, however, Endemol confirmed that this was just a rumor. During the third to sixth week in the house, there was a large plastic gate separating the Poor and Rich sides of the house.

Format
Big Brother is a game show in which a group of contestants, called housemates, live in isolation from the outside world in a custom built "house", which includes everyday facilities such as a fully equipped kitchen, garden, two bedrooms, and a bathroom. The house is also a television studio with cameras and microphones in most of the rooms to record the activities of the housemates. The only place where housemates can escape the company of the other contestants is the Diary Room, where they are encouraged to voice their true feelings. Not all Diary Room footage is broadcast due to the privacy of the contestants. Each week all housemates nominate two of their fellow contestants for potential eviction. Failure to do so may result in a punishment, such as a reduction in the prize fund. The two, or more, housemates with the highest number of nominations face a public vote conducted by phone, with the contestant receiving the most votes being evicted from the house. The last contestant remaining in the house is declared the winner and is awarded a cash prize of £70,000. On eviction night, there were two live eviction shows held. In the first, host Davina McCall would reveal to the housemates who had been evicted from the house, though the percentages were withheld from the group. Following the announcement, the evicted housemate had two hours to pack their belongings and prepare to leave the house. At the start of the second episode, McCall would inform the evicted housemate that they had only moments to walk out the door. Upon exiting through the house's front door, McCall led the evictee into a studio where they met with their family and friends. While in the studio, McCall had an interview with the evicted housemate, and showed their best bits - a video compilation of their time in the house.

Over the duration of the series, the Housemates are given a series of tasks by Big Brother which test them in many ways. They are also put to the test by their own ideals, prejudices and opinions against other people from different walks of life; something that has survived from the original "social experiment" of Big Brother 1. They live in the communal House and share cooking and cleaning chores among themselves, which usually provides plenty of tension. Housemates are forbidden to sleep during daylight hours (unless unwell) - Big Brother plays the wake-up call persistently in the morning if housemates do not wake up and will play an alarm clock noise into the house if a housemate falls asleep during the day. Housemates must also live by the fundamental rules of Big Brother; if the rules are broken it can result in formal warnings, various punishments or even a housemate's removal from the House. They must wash their own clothes by hand, and they have to make their own bread from scratch. Each week Big Brother sets the Housemates a task in order to determine the shopping budget for the following week. They must work together to win the tasks in order to win a luxury shopping budget which changed based on the number of people remaining in the house. If all food runs out in the House, Big Brother provides emergency rations of chickpeas and rice. Housemates are responsible for their own shopping and decide which items the budget will allow them to have. Only a small percentage of the overall budget can be spent on alcohol. Each night, the housemates were also given a discussion topic, and they would have group discussions in the living room.

Much like Big Brother 2, this series featured a twist in the format in an attempt to keep the series interesting. On the first night, it was revealed that all of the Housemates were nominated for eviction, and the public then began voting for who they would like to see leave the house. It was later revealed that the two Housemates with the highest number of eviction votes would be nominated for eviction, and that their fellow Housemates would vote to evict one of them. This resulted in the first eviction of the season occurring on Day 8, the first time that an eviction had occurred this early in the series. Another change in the format this season was the addition of the Rich and Poor sides of the house, in which one side would feature more benefits and luxuries than the other. This season also began using the "strikes" system, in which Housemates were allowed to have only three strikes before they were expelled from the series.

Housemates

Weekly summary 

 Housemate living on 'Rich Side'
 Housemate living on 'Poor Side'

Nominations table

Notes

: Instead of the housemates nominating and the public voting to evict, the public decided whom to nominate and the housemates would decide whom to evict. After the phone lines were opened Sunita decided to walk from the House; her line was therefore closed. Jade and Lynne received the most votes, and the remaining housemates collectively voted to evict Lynne.
:  As a new housemate, Sophie could not nominate and could not be nominated by her fellow housemates.
:  As punishment for discussing nominations, Jade was banned from nominating.  As a new housemate, Tim could not nominate and could not be nominated by his fellow housemates.
: There were no nominations in Week 7. Instead, the Housemates participated in a dilemma – to choose two of their own to receive video messages from home and also to be nominated.  After the Housemates could not reach a decision, they drew lots. PJ and Kate were nominated from the draw and received their videos.
: There were no nominations in the final week. The viewers voted for the housemate they wanted to win, rather than evict.

Ratings
Weekly ratings for each show on Channel 4. All numbers are in millions and provided by BARB.

Controversy and criticism
Much like the previous two editions of the series, Big Brother 3 had controversial moments and issues as well. The main issue this season was with Housemates voluntarily choosing to leave the game. On Day 7, Housemate Sunita chose to walk from the game, stating she "was feeling claustrophobic" and the show had effectively deprived contestants of their rights. Housemate Sandy decided to walk from the game on Day 20. Despite agreeing to leave that night through the door, he later climbed over the wall in the backyard and escaped the house. On his decision to walk, Sandy stated "I went on to the show with no preconceptions. I did what I feel was right and left when I felt it was right to leave." Housemates Lee and Sophie also talked about quitting the series, though neither of them did. The Rich and Poor divide caused numerous issues in the house, mainly when Housemate Tim became the only Housemate living on the Rich side for a week. The other Housemates were upset, with PJ later stating that the group should all walk; however, no Housemates left the game due to this issue. The production this season has also been criticized as being too edited, mainly in terms of Housemate Jade Goody. This season was also the first to have controversy surrounding sexual relations in the series. Though no actual sexual intercourse occurred in the house, Housemate Jade later gave Housemate PJ oral sex under the covers, and that same night Housemate Sophie was believed to have done the same with Housemate Lee. There was a debate on whether or not to show the events occurring on the highlight episode, eventually they chose to show them.

References

External links 
Big Brother - Series 3 at Channel4.com

2002 British television seasons
 3
Television shows shot at Elstree Film Studios